The ITV Turquoise is a French two-place, paraglider that was designed by Xavier Demoury and produced by ITV Parapentes of Épagny, Haute-Savoie. It is now out of production.

Design and development
The Turquoise The aircraft was designed as a tandem glider for flight training and as such was referred to as the Turquoise Bi, indicating "bi-place" or two seater. The models are each named for their approximate wing area in square metres.

Variants
Turquoise 38 Bi
Small-sized model for lighter crews.
Turquoise 43 Bi
Large-sized model for heavier crews. The glider model is IA Standard certified.

Specifications (Turquoise 43 Bi)

References

Turquoise
Paragliders